Tetradactylus udzungwensis, commonly known as the Udzungwa long-tailed seps, is a species of lizard in the family Gerrhosauridae.
The species is found in Tanzania.

References

Tetradactylus
Reptiles described in 2004
Fauna of Tanzania